The Saviour Brig. Pritam Singh is a Punjabi docudrama, that lasted from November 1947 to November 1948.

The film was awarded for Cult Critic Movie Awards in 2022.

Cast and Crew
Brigadier Pritam Singh:  Colonel DB Beer: Devinder S. Mahal

Crew

 Director: Paramjeet Singh Kattu 
 Producer: Karanvir Singh Sibia
 Executive Producer: Jaswinder Dhillon
 Director of Photography: Gurpreet Cheema
 Cast: Dhanveer Singh, Pali Sandhu, Karamjit Singh
 Costume Designer: Raj Bhullar
 Sound Designer: Manav Shrotriya
 Art Director: Romy 
 Action Director: Jassi 
 Production Controller: 1991 Films
 Production Manager: Rajveer Singh
 Post Production: Post Services, Mumbai

References 

2020s Punjabi-language films
2021 films
Indian war films